Gunby may refer to:

Gunby, East Riding of Yorkshire, England
Gunby, East Lindsey, Lincolnshire, England
Gunby, South Kesteven, Lincolnshire, England
Gunby (surname)